Mark Lair (born 1947) is a professional American bridge player from Canyon, Texas.

Lair is ranked 5th all-time on the American Contract Bridge League (ACBL) Top 500 listings with over 67,800 masterpoints (as of October 2018). He is an ACBL Grand Life Master and World Bridge Federation (WBF) World Life Master; he was inducted into the ACBL Hall of Fame in 2009.

Bridge accomplishments

Honors

 ACBL Hall of Fame, 2009
 Honorary lifetime appointment to the ACBL Goodwill Committee, 1997

Awards

 Fishbein Trophy (1) 1986
 Barry Crane Trophy (1) 1990
 Herman Trophy (1) 1994

Wins

 World Championships (2)
 The d'Orsi Seniors Trophy - Seniors Teams, 2015, Chennai, India
 The Rand Cup - Seniors Teams, 2018, Orlando, FL, USA 
 North American Bridge Championships (21)
 Blue Ribbon Pairs (2) 1984, 1994 
 Jacoby Open Swiss Teams (2) 1991, 2000 
 Truscott Senior Swiss Teams (1) 2008 
 Vanderbilt (3) 1979, 1997, 1998 
 Senior Knockout Teams (1) 2009 
 Keohane North American Swiss Teams (1) 1998 
 Mitchell Board-a-Match Teams (3) 1986, 1988, 1993 
 Chicago Mixed Board-a-Match (4) 1977, 1978, 1979, 1990 
 Reisinger (2) 1988, 1992 
 Spingold (2) 1986, 1989

Runners-up

 North American Bridge Championships
 Blue Ribbon Pairs (1) 1972 
 Mitchell Board-a-Match Teams (1) 1995 
 Chicago Mixed Board-a-Match (2) 1984, 2005 
 Reisinger (6) 1978, 1980, 1990, 1993, 1994, 2000 
 Spingold (1) 1994

References

External links
  – with video interview

1947 births
American contract bridge players
People from Canyon, Texas
Living people
Place of birth missing (living people)
Date of birth missing (living people)